Parliamentary elections were held in Greece on 14 October 1890. Supporters of Theodoros Deligiannis emerged as the largest bloc in Parliament, with 100 of the 150 seats. Deligiannis became Prime Minister for the second time on 5 November.

Results

References

Greece
Parliamentary elections in Greece
1890 in Greece
Greece
1890s in Greek politics
Charilaos Trikoupis